Charles Hunt, Jr. (born March 12, 1983) is an American football linebacker for the Jacksonville Sharks of National Arena League (NAL). He played as a linebacker for Florida State University. He was signed as a free agent by the Jacksonville Sharks in 2010.

Personal
Charles's father, Charles Hunt, Sr., played at Florida State University and in the NFL for the San Francisco 49ers and the Tampa Bay Buccaneers. Charles Jr. played at Episcopal High School in Jacksonville, Florida, where Charles Sr. is currently a coach.

External links
 Jacksonville Sharks Bio

1983 births
Living people
American football wide receivers
American football linebackers
Florida State Seminoles football players
Episcopal School of Jacksonville alumni
Players of American football from Jacksonville, Florida
Wyoming Cavalry players
Jacksonville Sharks players
Orlando Predators players